NPCA may stand for:

 National Parks Conservation Association
 National Peace Corps Association
 Niagara Peninsula Conservation Authority, in Ontario, Canada
 Northwest Pennsylvania Collegiate Academy, a high school in Erie, Pennsylvania